This is a list of the various non-SC communities originating from Telugu-speaking regions.

Forward Classes 
Forward castes do not qualify for government reservations. Those present in Andhra Pradesh and Telangana are: 

(arranged alphabetically)
Balija
Brahmin
Kamma
Kapu
Komati
Raju 
Reddy 
Telaga
Velama

Some communities within these groups are instead classified under other categories, as noted below.

Backward Classes 

Some communities are classified as Other Backward Classes due to social, financial, educational, and/or political discrimination. 

(arranged alphabetically)
Achukatlavandlu
Agaru
Agnikulakshatriya
Arekatika, Katika, Quresh (Muslim Butchers)
Aryakshatriya, Chittari, Giniyar, Chitrakara, Nakhas
Atagara
Atirasa (of Polavaram, Gopalapuram, Koyyalagudem, Buttayagudem, Chagallu Mandals of West Godavari district and Devipattanam, Korukonda and Gokavaram Mandals of East Godavari District)
Ayyaraka
Balasanthu, Bahurupi
Bandara
Bestha
Bhataraju (Brahma kshatriya)
Budabukkala
Budubunjala/ Bhunjwa/ Bhadbhunja (confined to Hyderabad and Ranga Reddy Districts only)
Chippolu (Mera)
Chopemari
Dasari (formerly engaged in Bhikshatana)
Devanga
Dommara
Dudekula, Laddaf, Pinjari or Noorbas
Ediga Gowda (Gamalla, Kalalee) Goundla Settibalija (of Visakhapatnam, East Godavari, West Godavari and Krishna District)
Gajula Balija (who are traditionally associated with selling of Bangles)
Gandla, Telikula, Devathilakula
Gangaputra
Gangavar
Gangiredlavaru
Gavara
Godaba
Golla (Yadava)
Goondla
Goud
Gudala
Gudia/Gudiya (confined to Srikakulam, Vizianagaram and Visakhapatnam Districts only)
Hatkar
Jakkala
Jalari
Jandra
Jangam
Jingar
Jogi
Joshinandiwala
Kachi
Kaikadi
Kandra
Kanjara-Bhatta
Karikalabhakthulu Kaikolan or Kaikola (Sengundam or Sengunther)
Karnabhakthulu
Kasi kapadi
Katipapala
Kepmare or Reddika
Kinthala Kalinga, Buragana Kalinga, Buragam Kalinga, Pandiri Kalinga, Kalinga
Koppulavelama
Korcha, Koracha
Koshti
Krishnabhalija (Dasari, Bukka, Bukka Ayavar)
Kummara or Kulala or Salivahana
Kunapuli
Kurakula
Kurmi (confined to Telangana Region and also Krishna District only)
Kuruba
Lakkamari Kapu (confined to Telangana Region only)
Lodh, Lodha, Lodhi
Mali (where they are not Scheduled Tribe)
Mandula
Mathura
Medari or Mahendra
Mehtar (Muslim)
Mondepatta Mondipatta
Mondivaru Mondibanda Banda
Mudiraj, Mutrasi Tenugollu
Munnurukapu (Telangana)
Nagaralu
Nagavaddilu
Nagavasam (Nagavamsa)
Nayi-Brahmin (Mangali, Mangala, Bhajanthri)
Nayyala
Neelakanthi
Neeli (Nelli)
Nessi or Kurni
Nokkar
Odde Oddilu Vaddi Vaddelu
Padmasali (Sali, Saliyan, Pattusali, Senapathulu, Thogata Sali)
Pala-Ekari
Palli
Pallikapu
Pallireddi
Pambala
Pamula
Pardhi (Mirshikari, Nirshikari )
Pariki Muggula
Passi
Patkar (Khatri)
Patra
Pattapu
Peddammavandlu, Devaravandlu, Yellammavandlu, Mutyalammavandlu
Perika (Perike Balija, Puragiri Kshatriya)
Pollinativelama (of Srikakulam & Visakhapatnam Districts)
Pondara
Poosala
Rajaka, Chakali, Vannar
Rangarez or Bhavasara Kshatriya
Sadhuchetty
Sarollu
Satani (Chattadasrivaishnava, Chatadi)
Scheduled Caste converts to Christianity and their progeny
Siddula
Sikligar
Srisayana (Segidi)
Surya Balija (Kalavanthula), Ganika
Swakulasali
Tammali
Thogata, Thogati or Thogata Veerakshatriya
Turupu Kapu and Gajula Kapu of Srikakulam, Vizianagram & Visakhapatnam Districts who are subject to social customs of divorce & remarriages among their women
Uppara or Sagara
Vadabalija
Valmiki Boya (Boya Bedar, Kirataka Nishadi, Yellappi, Yellapu/Yellapondlu, Pedda Boya ) Talayari, Chunduvallu
Vamsha Raj
Vanjara (Vanjari)
Vannekapu
Vannereddi
Vannia Vanniar Vannikula-Kshatriya
Vanyakulakshtriya
Veeramushti (Neetikotala), Veerabhadreeya
 Viswabrahmin or Viswakarma (Ausula or Kamsali, Kammari, Kanchari, Vadla or Vadra or Vadrangi and Silpi)
Yata

Further Classification of Backward Classes 
The castes considered to be backward are further categorized into 5 groups (A, B, C, D and E). And the reservations for these groups are allocated based on variety of factors but mostly based on size of the population.

 GROUP-A (Aboriginal Tribes, Vimuktha Jathis, Nomadic and SemiNomadic Tribes etc.)
 GROUP-B (Vocational Groups)
 GROUP-C (Harijan Converts)
 GROUP-D (Other Classes) 
 GROUP-E (Socially and Educationally Backward Classes of Muslims) introduced recently when compared to the above four groups.

See also 
Scheduled Castes and Scheduled Tribes
List of Scheduled Tribes in India#Andhra Pradesh

References 

Indian castes

Social groups of Telangana